Africallagma sapphirinum, the sapphire bluet, is a species of damselfly in the family Coenagrionidae. It is endemic to South Africa, where it is locally common.

This species is found in grassland, where its natural habitat is ponds and lakes with floating aquatic plants.

This bluet is 24–28 mm long, with a wingspan of 26–33 mm. The thorax is sapphire-blue with black dorsal and antehumeral stripes. The abdomen is deep blue and black; segments one to five are mainly sapphire-blue with a discontinuous black dorsal stripe, segments eight and nine are blue and segments six, seven and ten are mostly black.

References

Coenagrionidae
Insects of South Africa
Insects described in 1950